The Americans is a 2013 TV series set in the Cold War period.

The Americans may also refer to:
Americans, citizens of the United States
The Americans (1961 TV series), a TV series set during the American Civil War
The Americans (band), a roots rock band from Los Angeles, California
The Americans (commentary), a 1973 radio opinion piece by Gordon Sinclair
The Americans (gang), a gang in Cape Flats area of Cape Town
The Americans (novel), a 1979 novel by John Jakes
The Americans (photography), a 1958 book of photographs by Robert Frank
The Americans: The Democratic Experience, a 1973 American history book by Daniel J. Boorstin

See also
America (disambiguation)
American (word)
American (disambiguation)
The American (disambiguation)